Ghzil-Aghaj State Reserve, meaning golden tree, was established on July 3, 1929 by the Committee on Protection of the Ancient and Art Monuments of Azerbaijan on an area of 884 km² on Kyzylagach Bay at the southwestern shore of the Caspian Sea, in Lankaran District, southeastern Azerbaijan.

Creation
Qizil-Aghaj State Reserve was created for the purpose of protecting, creating conditions for wintering and nesting of migrant, swamp and wild birds in 1929. Along with the reserve, there is also the Little Qizil-Aghaj State Nature Protected area with a total area of 10,700 ha. Qizil-Aghaj is the first reserve in the country according to area, and the third according to date of establishment.

The reserve was included in the list of UNESCO Ramsar convention "On internationally important swampy areas as the birds' residing places" together with Ag-Gel National Park.

Flora and fauna 
Most species of birds included in the Red Book of Azerbaijan are found in the reserve and adjacent areas. The reserve accounts for 248 species of birds. Such mammals as wild boar, wolf, wild cat, badger, sable, fox, etc. populate this reserve. There are 54 fish species including clupea, caspian kutum, common carp, wels catfish, sander marinus, common bream, flathead grey mullet in the water basins of this reserve.

Birds

See also
 Nature of Azerbaijan
 National Parks of Azerbaijan
 State Reserves of Azerbaijan
 State Game Reserves of Azerbaijan
 Kura Island

References

State reserves of Azerbaijan
Lankaran District
Ramsar sites in Azerbaijan